
Year 499 (CDXCIX) was a common year starting on Friday (link will display the full calendar) of the Julian calendar. At the time, it was known as the Year of the Consulship of Iohannes without colleague (or, less frequently, year 1252 Ab urbe condita). The denomination 499 for this year has been used since the early medieval period, when the Anno Domini calendar era became the prevalent method in Europe for naming years.

Events 
 By place 
 China 
 April 26 – Emperor Xiaowen of Northern Wei dies of starvation in his capital at Luoyang, after a 27-year reign in which he has Sinicized his tribal relatives (Tuoba clan), created a Chinese-style government and instituted a land-reform program. 
 Crown prince Xuan Wu Di, age 16, succeeds his father Xiaowen and becomes emperor of Northern Wei. He appoints his uncle Yuan Xie provincial governor, who serves temporarily as regent to form a new government.

 Middle East 
 September – The 499 Nicopolis earthquake takes place in the borders between the regions of Mesopotamia, Pontus, and Roman Armenia. It affects the cities of Nicopolis, Neocaesarea (modern Niksar), Arsamosata, and Abarne, as well as the cultural areas of Anatolia (Asia Minor) and Mesopotamia.

 By topic 
 Religion 
 March 1 – During a synod in Rome, which is attended by 72 bishops and all of the Roman clergy, Pope Symmachus makes Antipope Laurentius bishop of the diocese of Nocera in Campania.

Mathematics 
 Indian mathematician Aryabhata writes his magnum opus, the Āryabhaṭīya.

Births 
 Ingund, queen of the Franks (approximate date)
 Ly Thien Bao, emperor of Vietnam (d. 555)
 Maximianus, bishop of Ravenna (d. 556)

Deaths 
 April 26 – Emperor Xiaowen of Northern Wei, emperor of Northern Wei (b. 467)
 Feng Run, Chinese empress of Northern Wei

References

Sources